The Copa del Rey 1903 was the first official staging of the Copa del Rey, the Spanish football cup competition. It followed the 1902 Copa de la Coronación, held to celebrate the coronation of King Alfonso XIII of Spain, which was won by Club Vizcaya de Bilbao (a temporary combination of Bilbao Football Club and Athletic Bilbao) and given to them permanently.

Details
The competition was played between 6 and 8 April 1903. Three teams took part: Athletic Bilbao, Espanyol of Barcelona and Madrid FC. It took the form of a round-robin, but the results of the first two games meant that the third game became the final. That match, held at the Hipódromo in Madrid, saw Athletic Bilbao take the trophy for the first time as a distinct club, beating Madrid 3–2 after trailing 2–0 at half time.

As a result, the tally of Copa wins by Athletic Bilbao is disputed. The 1902 cup, won by Club Vizcaya, is on display in the Athletic museum, and the club includes the victory in its honours list. However, neither the Liga de Fútbol Profesional (LFP) nor the Real Federación Española de Fútbol (RFEF) official statistics include this as an Athletic win: they count the 1903 cup as its first.

Results

Day 1

Day 2

Day 3 (Final)

References

External links
bdfutbol.com
RSSSF.com

1903
1903 domestic association football cups
1902–03 in Spanish football